The R592 road is a regional road in Ireland, located in County Cork.

References

Regional roads in the Republic of Ireland
Roads in County Cork